Ed Crombie (born October 13, 1945 in Williams Lake, British Columbia) is a former Canadian-born United States Auto Club Championship Car race car driver.

He made four starts with a best finish of 7th at Mosport in 1977. He failed to qualify for the 1976 Indianapolis 500.

See also
List of Canadians in Champ Car

External links
Career Stats

Racing drivers from British Columbia
1945 births
Living people
People from the Cariboo Regional District
20th-century Canadian people